El Ejido is a municipality of Almería province, in the autonomous community of Andalusia, Spain. It is located 32 km from Almería with a surface area of 227 km2, and as reported in 2014 had 84,144 inhabitants. El Ejido is the centre of production for fruit and vegetables in the "Comarca de El Poniente". The work opportunities the city provides attract many foreign farmhands, who look for jobs mainly in the greenhouses there. Some greenhouses have begun using computer-controlled hydroponics systems, thus saving on labour, improving efficiency and the local economy.

In close proximity to the city along the coast line is situated Almerimar, a popular destination for tourism and relaxation.

2000 riots

In February 2000, the town was the site of three days of anti-immigrant riots after two local men and one woman were killed by two separate Moroccans.

Transport
El Ejido is one of the largest Spanish towns without access to the rail network; in 2020 a proposal was submitted to build a railway from Almería to Adra via Roquetas de Mar and El Ejido; with El Ejido mayor Francisco Góngora confirming his support for such a project.

Demographics

Sport
CD El Ejido 2012 is based in the municipality.

See also
El Ejido, la loi du profit

References

External links
  El Ejido - Sistema de Información Multiterritorial de Andalucía
 Viva Almeria

Municipalities in the Province of Almería